Grass Lake Nature Park is a nature reserve in Olympia, Washington.

The central feature of the park is Grass Lake, a reservoir dammed in 1966. Swamp grass in the lake accounts for the name.

The lake and surrounding wetland has been owned by the City of Olympia since the 1980s. Amenities include a  hiking trail.

References

Lakes of Thurston County, Washington
Parks in Olympia, Washington